Imperial Noble Consort Zhemin (died 20 August 1735), of the Manchu Plain Yellow Banner Fuca clan, was a consort of the Qianlong Emperor.

Life

Family background
Imperial Noble Consort Zhemin's personal name was not recorded in history. She was a member of the Plain Yellow Banner Fuca clan by birth.

 Father: Wengguotu, served as a fourth rank military official
 One sister: Wife of Gioro Yongqing (永清)

Yongzheng era
It is not known when Lady Fuca became a lady-in-waiting of Hongli, the Yongzheng Emperor's fourth son. In 1725, she became his mistress. She gave birth on 5 July 1728 to his first son, Yonghuang, and in May or June 1731 to his second daughter, who would die prematurely in December 1731 or January 1732. Lady Fuca died on 20 August 1735.

Qianlong era
The Yongzheng Emperor died on 8 October 1735 and was succeeded by Hongli, who was enthroned as the Qianlong Emperor. In November or December 1736, the Qianlong Emperor granted Lady Fuca the posthumous title "Consort Zhe". In May 1745, she was posthumously elevated to "Imperial Noble Consort Zhemin" by virtue of her son being the emperor's first son. In 1752, she was interred in the Yu Mausoleum of the Eastern Qing tombs.

Titles
 During the reign of the Kangxi Emperor (r. 1661–1722):
 Lady Fuca
 During the reign of the Yongzheng Emperor (r. 1722–1735):
 Mistress (from 1725)
 During the reign of the Qianlong Emperor (r. 1735–1796):
 Consort Zhe (from November/December 1736), fourth rank consort
 Imperial Noble Consort (from 24 February 1745), second rank consort
 Imperial Noble Consort Zhemin (from May 1745)

Issue
 As a mistress:
 Yonghuang (5 July 1728 – 21 April 1750), the Qianlong Emperor's first son, posthumously honoured as Prince Ding'an of the First Rank
 The Qianlong Emperor's second daughter (1 June 1731 – 6 January 1732)

See also
 Ranks of imperial consorts in China#Qing
 Royal and noble ranks of the Qing dynasty

Notes

References
 

18th-century births
1735 deaths
Consorts of the Qianlong Emperor